Philippe Vatuone (born 13 April 1962) is a French former gymnast who competed in the 1984 Summer Olympics.He also won a silver medal at The 1983 Worlds artistic gymnastics championships on high bar.

References

People from Sète
1962 births
Living people
French male artistic gymnasts
Olympic gymnasts of France
Gymnasts at the 1984 Summer Olympics
Olympic bronze medalists for France
Olympic medalists in gymnastics
Medalists at the 1984 Summer Olympics
Sportspeople from Hérault
20th-century French people